Amjad Jaimoukha (Circassian: Жэмыхъуэ Амджэд, ; sometimes quoted as "Амыщ", the Circassian personal name) was a Circassian writer, publicist and historian, who wrote a number of books on North Caucasian – specifically Circassian and Chechen – culture and folklore. According to the Circassian Encyclopaedia, "Jaimoukha is perhaps the most important writer on Circassian issues." He was considered one of the most influential Circassian writers and publicists in the last decade. In particular, he was active in promoting and assisting a new crop of Circassian and non-Circassian writers working on raising the profile of Caucasian issues at the global level.

Principal works
The Circassians: A Handbook (London and New York: Routledge; New York: Palgrave, 2001): It has become the prime reference work on the Circassians. It has been reviewed in more than a dozen international journals."
The Chechens: A Handbook (Routledge, 2005) with contributions from the Canadian writer and poet JonArno Lawson. The book sheds light on some obscure aspects of Chechen culture and folklore, and includes an account of the ancient native religion and beliefs of the Nakh peoples (Chechens, Ingush, Kist, and Batsbi [Tsova-Tush]). According to the publishers it is "the only comprehensive treatment of this subject available in English".
Kabardian-English Dictionary, Sanjalay Press, 1997. (Some 22,000 words, 574 pages. Principally based on: Kardanov (Qarden), B. M. (ed.), КЪЭБЭРДЕЙ-УРЫС СЛОВАРЬ. Kabardinsko-russki slovar’ [Kabardian-Russian Dictionary], Kabardino-Balkarian Science and Research Institute, Moscow: State Press of Foreign and National Dictionaries, 1957.
Parlons tcherkesse: Dialecte kabarde [Let's Speak Circassian: Kabardian Dialect], (Paris: L'Harmattan, 2009) Co-authored with Michel Malherbe. This book is the only treatment of the Kabardian dialect of Circassian in the French language.
Circassian Culture and Folklore: Hospitality Traditions, Cuisine, Festivals & Music (Kabardian, Cherkess, Adigean, Shapsugh & Diaspora), London: Bennett and Bloom, 2010.
Circassian Customs and Traditions, The International Center for Circassian Studies, 2009.
Circassian Religion, The International Centre for Circassian Studies, 2009.
Circassian Bibliography, The International Centre for Circassian Studies, 2009.
Circassian Proverbs and Sayings, Sanjalay Press, 2009. (Has some 3,000 entries in Kabardian [in Cyrillic and Latin orthographies] with corresponding English expressions)

Jaimoukha published with the following Western publishing houses: Routledge [RoutledgeCurzon], Curzon, Bennett and Bloom, Palgrave (Macmillan) [St. Martin's Press], L'Harmattan. He also worked with Sanjalay Press and the International Centre for Circassian Studies.

International Centre for Circassian Studies (ICCS)
Jaimoukha was director of the International Centre for Circassian Studies (ICCS), an institute specializing in the dissemination of Circassian culture and folklore. The Center is the brainchild of the famous Circassian writer and film producer and director Mohydeen Quandour.  The principal aim of the Centre is the development and dissemination of Circassian literature, culture and folklore. There is a particular emphasis on boosting the status of Circassian and to promote its teaching and use. The Centre publishes a bilingual journal (in Circassian and English) "The Hearth Tree". The publications of the Centre can be accessed via its website.

Jaimoukha devised a Latin orthography for Kabardian (Eastern Circassian) that is characterised by relative simplicity (considering the complexity of the language). An advantage of this system is that it has a one-to-one correspondence with the current Cyrillic orthography used for Kabardian, and already a software has been designed to render one orthography into the other, making it possible to turn works already published in Cyrillic Kabardian into the new orthography, and vice versa, facilitating transition from one system to the other.

Work at the Royal Scientific Society 
Jaimoukha previously held the position of Assistant President of the Royal Scientific Society (RSS) in the period 2003-2007. He published a number of studies and bibliographic tomes during his tenure at RSS, including Scientific Integrity, Intellectual Capital Report, and Bibliography of the Publications of the Royal Scientific Society.

Circassian culture and folklore
Jaimoukha was a strong advocate of the revival of all aspects of Circassian culture and folklore, including obsolete and defunct genres of art and culture. He wrote a number of books and articles in journals and newspapers championing the raising of the status of the Circassian language in both the Circassian republics in the Northwest Caucasus (where about one million Circassians live) and in the diaspora (principally in Turkey, Syria, Jordan, Egypt, Iraq, US, Germany, France, and the Netherlands), where some 5 million descendants of the 19th-century Circassian forced immigrants reside. The ultimate survival of the Circassian language and culture is intimately associated with the political fate of the Circassians in the Caucasus and the re-establishment of Circassia as a viable state, recognized as a full member of the comity of nations. The unification of the Kabardians, Cherkess, Adigeans, and Shapsugh in the Northwest Caucasus in the political and cultural spheres is a requisite step towards enhanced autonomy. Jaimoukha was among the vocal Circassians actively engaged in raising awareness of Circassian issues amongst the Circassians themselves and at a global level. He planned to publish a book on the controversial issue of the 2014 Sochi Winter Olympics, to be held in Circassia.

Jaimoukha was a proponent of North Caucasian unity and independence (from Daghestan in the east to Abkhazia in the west). He advocated Circassian independence on a number of media outlets. He referred to the historical lands of the Circassians as "Circassia". Despite the linguistic diversity, the peoples of the North Caucasus share similar traditions, beliefs and culture. His work "Thoughts on North Caucasian Federation" maps a plan of unification of the western part of the region (the historical lands of the Circassians (Adiga), Abkhaz-Abaza [Apswa] and the Ubykh). According to this scheme, the Adiga entities (perhaps with the inclusion of the Abaza) would be united into one independent state that might eventually opt to enter into federative arrangements with the already independent Abkhaz and the Karachai-Balkar state. This would remove the artificial tensions that might flare up into open conflict between the Kabardians and Balkar in Kabardino-Balkaria and the Karachai and Cherkess in the Karachay–Cherkess Republic. The Adigeans would become more secure and more resistant to the Russian drive to undo their fragile republic. It would seem that the logical (interim) step of uniting the Kabardians and Cherkess into one autonomous entity on the one hand and the Karachai and Balkar into another, on the other, is considered taboo by the authorities in the two republics.

Collaborations
Principal literary collaborations included work with Nicholas Awde, the editor of the Caucasus World series published by Routledge and co-owner of the publishing house Bennett and Bloom, JonArno Lawson, the writer of a number of fantastic books, and Michel Malherbe, the prolific writer and editor of the Parlons... series published by the French publishing house L'Harmattan. A work on the Adigean dialect of Circassian was scheduled to be published by L'Harmattan in 2010. Jaimoukha contributed five articles (on the Circassians, Kabardians, Karachai, Dagestanis, and Jordan) in Carl Skutsche's seminal three-volume work Encyclopedia of the World's Minorities, published by Routledge  in 2004 in New York.

There was a close co-operation with the Circassian writer Luba Belaghi (Balagova; publications in Circassian and Russian) in the framework of the publications of the International Centre for Circassian Studies.

References

Mamser, M., The Circassian Encyclopaedia, 2009, vol. IV, entry "Amjad Jaimoukha". [There are two entries for Amjad Jaimoukha: one concerning his work at the Royal Scientific Society and the other on his career as a writer and publicist]

External links
The International Centre for Circassian Studies website
Personal website
Circassian Culture and Folklore website
"The acclaimed book by Amjad Jaimoukha is available at eBooks.com in several formats for your eReader."

1964 births
2017 deaths
Cultural anthropologists
History of the North Caucasus
Nationality missing